Thomas John Maxwell (1924–2019) was an officer in the Royal Air Force (RAF).  He served as a tail gunner during World War II, flying 32 missions and escaping captivity after being shot down in France.  After the war, he worked in RAF air traffic control and then for the Royal Air Force of Oman.

References

1924 births
2019 deaths
Royal Air Force officers
Recipients of the Distinguished Flying Cross (United Kingdom)
Recipients of the Legion of Honour
Royal Air Force personnel of World War II
Shot-down aviators
British World War II prisoners of war
World War II prisoners of war held by Germany
British escapees
Escapees from German detention